The Finland women's national under-20 volleyball team represents Finland in international women's volleyball competitions and friendly matches under the age 20 and it is ruled by the Finnish Volleyball Federation That is an affiliate of Federation of International Volleyball FIVB and also a part of European Volleyball Confederation CEV.

Results

FIVB U21 World Championship
 Champions   Runners up   Third place   Fourth place

Europe Junior Championship
 Champions   Runners up   Third place   Fourth place

Team

Current squad
The Following players is the Finnish players that Competed in the 2018 Women's U19 Volleyball European Championship Qualifications

References

External links
www.lentopalloliitto.fi/en 

Volleyball
National women's under-20 volleyball teams
Volleyball in Finland